A commentary article is a short narrowly focused article that is usually commissioned by an Academic journal, though they are sometimes published from unsolicited submissions.

References  

Academic publishing
Scholarly communication
Peer review